Richard Pole may refer to:

Sir Richard Pole (courtier) (1462–1505), Welsh supporter of King Henry VII and husband of Margaret Pole, Countess of Salisbury
Richard de la Pole (died 1525), pretender to the English crown
Sir Richard Carew Pole, 13th Baronet (born 1938), present holder of the baronetcy granted to his ancestor by King Charles I in 1628
Dick Pole (born 1950), former Major League Baseball pitcher